Blow commonly refers to:
Cocaine
Exhalation
Strike (attack)

Blow, Blew, Blowing, or Blown may also refer to:

People
Blew (surname)
Blow (surname)

Arts and entertainment

Music
The Blow, an American electro-pop band

Albums 
Blow (Foetus album), 2001
Blow (Ghinzu album) or the title song, 2004
Blow (Heather Nova album), 1993
Blow (Messy Marv and Berner album), 2009
Blow: Blocks and Boat Docks or the title song, by Messy Marv and Berner, 2010
Blow (Red Lorry Yellow Lorry album) or the title song, 1989
Blow (Straitjacket Fits album), 1993

Songs 
"Blew", by Nirvana, 1989
"Blow" (Beyoncé song), 2013
"Blow" (Ed Sheeran, Chris Stapleton and Bruno Mars song), 2019
"Blow" (Kesha song), 2011
"Blow" (Martin Solveig song), 2014
"Blow" (Moneybagg Yo song), 2022
"B.L.O.W.", by Tory Lanez, 2015
"Blow", by Ashnikko, 2018
"Blow", by Atreyu from Lead Sails Paper Anchor, 2007
"Blow", by the Prom Kings from The Prom Kings, 2005
"Blow", by Rick Ross from Port of Miami, 2006
"Blow", by Theory of a Deadman from Savages, 2014
"Blow", by Tyler, the Creator from Bastard, 2009
"Da Blow", by Lil Jon from Crunk Juice, 2004
"Blown", by DNCE from DNCE, 2016

Other media 
Blow (film), a 2001 American crime film directed by Ted Demme and starring Johnny Depp and Penélope Cruz
"Blow" (My Name Is Earl), a television episode
Blown, a novel by Philip José Farmer, sequel to Image of the Beast

Other uses
Blow (drink), a brand of energy drink
Blow, to play a wind instrument
Blow job, a type of oral sex
Blowing or insufflation, a method of ingesting cocaine
Blown save, a baseball term

See also
Bloo, a character in Foster's Home for Imaginary Friends
Blow Job (disambiguation)
Blow off (disambiguation)
Blow up (disambiguation)
Blowout (disambiguation)
Blow by Blow, a 1975 album by Jeff Beck